The following is a list of medical schools (or universities with a medical school), in Asia.

Afghanistan
Jami University
Al-Beroni University
Ghalib University
Herat University
Ibne-sina Balkh Medical School
Kabul Medical University
Kandahar University
Nangarhar University
Spinghar Higher Education Centre

Armenia
Armenian Medical Institute
Yerevan Haybusak University
Yerevan State Medical University
Yerevan University of Traditional Medicine

Azerbaijan
Azerbaijan Medical University
Khazar University

Bahrain

Bangladesh

Cambodia
International University, Cambodia (IU)
University of Health Sciences – Cambodia (UHS-C)
University of Puthisastra (UP)

People's Republic of China

Hong Kong

Georgia
Akaki Tsereteli State University
David Agmashenebeli University of Georgia
Tbilisi State Medical University
Tbilisi State University
Tbilisi Medical Academy
David Tvildiani Medical University

India

Indonesia

Japan

Jordan

Hashemite University
Jordan University of Science and Technology
Mutah University
University of Jordan

Kazakhstan
NJSC Astana Medical University
Ahmet Yesevi Üniversitesi
Karaganda State Medical University
Kazakh National Medical University
Semipalatinsk State Medical Academy
South Kazakhstan State Medical Academy
West Kazakhstan Marat Ospanov State Medical University
Kazakh-Russian Medical University

Kyrgyzstan
Bishkek International Medical Institute
International Medical Faculty, Osh State University
Asian Medical Institute
International Higher School of Medicine
Jalalabad State University
Kyrgyz-Russian Slavic University
Kyrgyz State Medical Academy
Medical Institute, Osh State University
International Medical Institute, Bishkek
Medical Faculty, Adam University, Bishkek

Laos
University of Health Sciences

Lebanon
American University of Beirut
Holy Spirit University of Kaslik
Lebanese American University
Lebanese University
University of Balamand
Université Saint Joseph

Malaysia

Mongolia
Inner Mongolia Medical University
Mongolian National University
Mongolian National University of Medical Sciences (separated from National University of Mongolia)

Myanmar (Burma)
 Defence Services Medical Academy (DSMA)
 University of Dental Medicine, Mandalay
 University of Dental Medicine, Yangon
 University of Medicine 1, Yangon
 University of Medicine 2, Yangon
 University of Medicine, Magway
 University of Medicine, Mandalay
 University of Medicine, Taunggyi
 University of Nursing, Mandalay
 University of Nursing, Yangon
 University of Medical Technology, Mandalay
 University of Medical Technology, Yangon
 University of Traditional Medicine, Mandalay

North Korea
Chongjin Medical University
Haeju Medical University
Hamhung Medical University
Hyesan Medical University
Kanggye Medical University
Pyongsong Medical University
Pyongyang Medical University
Sariwon Medical University
Sinuiju Medical University
Wonsan Medical University

Nepal
Birat Medical College, Biratnagar
B.P. Koirala Institute of Health Sciences
Chitwan Medical College
College of Medical Sciences
Devdaha Medical College, Butwal
Gandaki Medical College, Pokhara
Institute of Medicine
Janaki Medical College, Janakpur
Kathmandu Medical College
Kathmandu University School of Medical Sciences
KIST Medical College, Kathmandu
Lumbini Medical College, Palpa
Manipal College of Medical Sciences
National Academy of Medical Sciences
National Medical College
Nepal Army Institute of Health Sciences, Kathmandu
Nepal Medical College
Nepalgunj Medical College, Nepalgunj
Nobel Medical College, Biratnagar
Patan Academy of Health Sciences
Universal College of Medical Sciences, Bhairawa

Pakistan

Palestine
 Al-Quds University Faculty of Medicine
 An-Najah National University Faculty of Medicine and Health Sciences
 Arab American University Faculty of Medicine
 Hebron University College of Medicine
 Islamic University of Gaza Faculty of Medicine
 Palestine Polytechnic University College of Human Medicine

Philippines

Russia

Saudi Arabia
Alfaisal University
Batterjee Medical College
Ibn Sina National College for Medical Studies
Imam Muhammad ibn Saud Islamic University
King Faisal University
King Saud bin Abdulaziz University for Health Sciences
King Saud University
Majmaah University
Northern Borders University
Qassim University
Sulaiman Al Rajhi Colleges
Umm al-Qura University

Seychelles
University of Seychelles - American Institute of Medicine

Singapore
Duke–NUS Medical School (National University of Singapore)
Lee Kong Chian School of Medicine (Nanyang Technological University)
Yong Loo Lin School of Medicine (National University of Singapore)

South Korea

Sri Lanka
Wayamba University of Sri Lanka
Sabaragamuwa University of Sri Lanka
University of Moratuwa
Eastern University of Sri Lanka
General Sir John Kotelawala Defence University 
Rajarata University
South Asian Institute of Technology and Medicine (defunct )
University of Colombo (formerly the Ceylon Medical College)
Institute of Indigenous Medicine 
Postgraduate Institute of Medicine
University of Jaffna
University of Kelaniya (formerly the North Colombo Medical College)
University of Peradeniya
University of Ruhuna
University of Sri Jayewardenepura
Open International University for Complementary Medicines

Syria

Taiwan, Republic of China

Tajikistan
Tajik State Medical University

Thailand

Turkmenistan
Turkmen State Medical University

Uzbekistan
Bukhara State Medical Institute, Bukhara
Tashkent Pediatric Medical Institute
Samarkand State Medical Institute
Tashkent medical academy

Vietnam
Can Tho University of Medicine and Pharmacy
Hai Phong Medical University
Hanoi Medical University
Ho Chi Minh City University of Medicine and Pharmacy
Huế College of Medicine and Pharmacy
Pham Ngoc Thach University of Medicine
University of Da Nang, School Of Medicine and Pharmacy
Thái Bình Medical University
Thái Nguyên University
Tra Vinh University
Vietnam National University, Hanoi
Vietnam National University, Ho Chi Minh City
Vinh Medical University

References

Asia

Medical schools
Lists of universities and colleges in Asia